Paramiana is a genus of moths of the family Noctuidae erected by William Barnes and Foster Hendrickson Benjamin in 1924.

Species
 Paramiana callaisata Blanchard, 1972
 Paramiana canoa (Barnes, 1907)
 Paramiana marina (J. B. Smith, 1906)
 Paramiana perissa Nye, 1975
 Paramiana smaragdina (Neumoegen, 1884)

Former species
 Paramiana exculta Blanchard & Knudson, 1986 is now a synonym of Euamiana endopolia (Dyar, 1912)

References

Hadeninae